Qatar Chronicle was a daily English language news web portal published in Qatar. Its website ceased publishing new stories in 2015.

The publication had an active social media presence.

History 
The Qatar Chronicle was founded in September 2012 as an English language news portal.

Though it began reporting mostly on events and happenings in Qatar, it quickly diversified into other areas including politics, sports, international news, entertainment and travel.

The Chronicle aimed to deliver a balanced perspective on local and world events that was not always in line with the official line which local media were encouraged to follow.

References

2012 establishments in Qatar
2015 disestablishments in Qatar
Defunct newspapers published in Qatar
English-language newspapers published in Qatar
Mass media in Doha
Middle Eastern news websites
Newspapers established in 2012
Publications disestablished in 2015